The 2022 Carinthian Ladies Lake's Trophy was a professional tennis tournament played on outdoor clay courts. It was the first edition of the tournament which was part of the 2022 ITF Women's World Tennis Tour. It took place in Pörtschach am Wörthersee, Austria between 6 and 12 June 2022.

Champions

Singles

  Laura Siegemund def.  Viktória Kužmová, 6–2, 6–2

Doubles

  Jessie Aney /  Anna Sisková def.  Jenny Dürst /  Weronika Falkowska, 6–3, 6–4

Singles main draw entrants

Seeds

 1 Rankings are as of 23 May 2022.

Other entrants
The following players received wildcards into the singles main draw:
  Elena Karner
  Melanie Klaffner
  Sinja Kraus
  Mavie Österreicher

The following player received entry into the singles main draw using a protected ranking:
  Laura Ioana Paar

The following player received entry into the singles main draw as a special exempt:
  Lena Papadakis

The following players received entry from the qualifying draw:
  Michaela Bayerlová
  Weronika Falkowska
  María Herazo González
  Robin Montgomery
  Angelica Moratelli
  Nina Potočnik
  Ekaterina Reyngold
  Julia Riera

The following players received entry as lucky losers:
  Nicole Fossa Huergo
  Nika Radišić

References

External links
 2022 Carinthian Ladies Lake's Trophy at ITFtennis.com

2022 ITF Women's World Tennis Tour
2022 in Austrian sport
June 2022 sports events in Europe